Kendyl LeMarc Jacox (born June 10, 1975) is a former American football offensive guard. He most recently played for the Miami Dolphins, and college football at Kansas State University.

Jacox appeared in 58 games for the Chargers between 1998–2001, including 30 starts. After signing with the New Orleans Saints in 2002, Jacox appeared in 56 games - starting all but one - between 2002-2005.

After a rash of injuries at the right guard position during training camp and preseason, the Miami Dolphins signed Jacox as a free agent on September 3, 2006. Jacox has started one game at right guard for the Dolphins 2006 and has played in a reserve role for the other games.

1975 births
Living people
American football offensive linemen
San Diego Chargers players
New Orleans Saints players
Miami Dolphins players
Kansas State Wildcats football players